Finette Cendron (meaning in English, Cunning Cinders) is a French literary fairy tale written by Madame d'Aulnoy.

It combines Aarne-Thompson types 327A and 510A. Other tales of 510A type include "Cinderella", "Katie Woodencloak", "Fair, Brown and Trembling", "The Sharp Grey Sheep", "Rushen Coatie", or "The Wonderful Birch".

Synopsis
A king and queen lost their kingdom and sold all they had brought with them, until they were poor.  The queen resolved that she could make nets, with which the king could catch birds and fish to support them.  As for their three daughters, they were useless; the king should take them somewhere and leave them there.

Their youngest, Finette, heard this and went to her fairy godmother.  She became tired on the way and sat down to cry.  A jennet appeared before her, and she begged it to carry her to her godmother.  Her godmother gave her a ball of thread that, if she tied to the house door, would lead her back, and a bag with gold and silver dresses.

The next day, their mother led them off and urged them to go to sleep in a meadow.  Then she left.  Though her sisters were cruel to her, Finette woke them.  The sisters promised her many things if she would lead them, and they made their way back.  Their mother pretended she had left to get something else.  Her sisters blamed Finette, gave her nothing they had promised, and beat her.  The queen resolved to lead them away further, so Finette visited her godmother again.  Her godmother told her this time to bring a sack of ashes and use it to make footprints, but she should not bring her sisters back, and she would never see her godmother again if she did.  The queen led them off, her sisters bewailed their fate, and Finette had pity on them.  The king and queen plotted for a third time, and the middle sister said they could leave peas for their path, but Finette brought her jewelry and the bag of clothing instead.  When the queen abandoned them, pigeons had eaten their peas, and they could not return.

Finette found an acorn and refused to let them eat it; instead, they planted it.  They ate cabbages and lettuce.  The acorn grew into a tree and Finette climbed it.  One day, her sisters looked into her bag and found her jewelry; they stole it and put stones in its place.  After this, one day Finette saw from the tree a dazzling castle.  Her sisters stole her clothing and jewelry and left her in rags when they went to it.  A hideous and enormous old woman told them that it was an ogre's castle.  She told them she would let them live a few days; they tried to flee but she caught them.  The ogre returned, and she hid them so she could eat them herself.  He smelled them, and she persuaded him to keep them to look after the castle, so she could eat them while he was gone.  While they were at work, Finette tricked the ogre into the oven and burned him to cinders.  Then she persuaded the ogress that if she let them dress her and do her hair, she would soon find a noble husband.  While she was doing the hair, she cut off the ogress's head.

Her sisters dressed themselves in the treasures of the castle and, so they might find husbands, went off to show themselves in the nearest town, threatening to beat her if the castle was not perfectly kept.  They came back with tales of dancing with the king's son and kept going and leaving her behind.  One day, Finette found an old key, and it proved to be gold and to open a chest full of beautiful clothing.  When her sisters left, she dressed herself and followed to the ball, where she called herself Cendron and everyone paid court to her.

For many days, this went on; the chest always produced new clothing.  But one day, Finette left in a hurry because she had to get back before her sisters, and she left behind a red velvet slipper, embroidered with pearls.  The king's oldest son found it and fell ill.  No doctor could cure him.  He said he had fallen in love with the woman whose shoe it was, so they ordered all the women to appear and try it on.  Her sisters went, but Finette did not know the way.  She dressed herself and found the jennet at her door again.  She rode past her sisters, splashing them with mud.  When she put on the slipper, the prince wanted to marry her, but Finette insisted that the king, who was the one who had conquered her parents' kingdom, restore it to them, first.  They agreed.  She married off her sisters and sent back to the jennet with gifts for her fairy godmother.

Analysis
James Planché, author and dramatist who adapted many of MMe. d'Aulnoy's tales for the stage, noted that the tale of Finette Cendron is a "compound" of Hop-o'-My-Thumb and Cinderella, both by Charles Perrault.

Alternate names for the tale are: The Curious Story of Finetta or The Story of Finetta, or, The Cinder-Girl.

See also
Cinderella
Fair, Brown and Trembling
Hansel and Gretel
Molly Whuppie
The Wonderful Birch

References

Further reading
 Trinquet, Charlotte. “On the Literary Origins of Folkloric Fairy Tales: A Comparison between Madame d’Aulnoy’s “Finette Cendron” and Frank Bourisaw’s “Belle Finette”.” Marvels & Tales 21 (2007): 34 - 49.

External links

Female characters in fairy tales
Works by Madame d'Aulnoy
ATU 500-559
ATU 300-399